Watson Lake Cone is a cinder cone in southern Yukon, Canada, located near the British Columbia-Yukon border. It formed and last erupted during the Pleistocene period and is part of the Northern Cordilleran Volcanic Province.

See also
List of volcanoes in Canada
List of Northern Cordilleran volcanoes
Volcanism of Canada
Volcanism of Northern Canada

References

Volcanoes of Yukon
Northern Cordilleran Volcanic Province